The canton of Montech is an administrative division of the Tarn-et-Garonne department, in southern France. Its seat is in Montech.

It consists of the following communes:

Albefeuille-Lagarde 
Bessens
Bressols
Finhan
Lacourt-Saint-Pierre
Monbéqui
Montbartier
Montbeton
Montech

References

Cantons of Tarn-et-Garonne